Onychostoma rarum is a species of cyprinid in the genus Onychostoma.

References

Cyprinid fish of Asia
rarum
Fish of China